Agymnastus venerabilis is a species of band-winged grasshopper in the family Acrididae.  It is found in North America.

References

Further reading

 
 

Oedipodinae